Nicholas Michael Murphy (born 25 December 1946) is an English former professional footballer who played in the Football League as a midfielder. He is the son of Manchester United former coach and temporary manager Jimmy Murphy.

References
General
. Retrieved 20 October 2013.
Specific

1946 births
Living people
Sportspeople from West Bromwich
English footballers
Association football midfielders
Manchester United F.C. players
Reading F.C. players
Altrincham F.C. players
Bangor City F.C. players
English Football League players